Ilona Nagy (born January 21, 1951, in Budapest) is a former Hungarian handball player, Olympic Games and World Championship bronze medalist.

References

External links
Profile on Database Olympics

1951 births
Living people
Handball players from Budapest
Hungarian female handball players
Handball players at the 1976 Summer Olympics
Olympic handball players of Hungary
Olympic bronze medalists for Hungary
Olympic medalists in handball
Medalists at the 1976 Summer Olympics
20th-century Hungarian women
21st-century Hungarian women